Kendallville Downtown Historic District  is a national historic district located at Kendallville, Noble County, Indiana.  The district encompasses 45 contributing buildings in the central business district of Kendallville.  It developed between about 1863 and 1940, and includes notable examples of Italianate, Queen Anne, Romanesque Revival, Classical Revival, and Bungalow / American Craftsman style architecture. Located in the district is the separately listed Iddings-Gilbert-Leader-Anderson Block.  Other notable buildings include the City Hall (1914), Diggins Building (1892), Masonic Hall Building (c. 1865), and Bernhalter Building (c. 1910).

It was listed on the National Register of Historic Places in 2003.

References

Historic districts on the National Register of Historic Places in Indiana
Queen Anne architecture in Indiana
Italianate architecture in Indiana
Romanesque Revival architecture in Indiana
Neoclassical architecture in Indiana
Bungalow architecture in Indiana
Historic districts in Noble County, Indiana
National Register of Historic Places in Noble County, Indiana